Josef Blum (4 February 1898 – 18 October 1956) was an Austrian international footballer and coach.

References

1898 births
1956 deaths
Footballers from Vienna
Association football defenders
Austrian footballers
Austria international footballers
First Vienna FC players
Austrian football managers
Austrian expatriate football managers
FK Austria Wien managers
RC Strasbourg Alsace managers
First Vienna FC managers
Expatriate football managers in France
Austrian expatriate sportspeople in France